Mariatorget metro station is a station on the red line of the Stockholm metro, located in the district of Södermalm beneath Mariatorget. The station was opened on 5 April 1964 as part of the first stretch of the Red line, between T-Centralen and Fruängen. Stockholm South Station is about five minutes away on Swedenborgsgatan.

References

External links
 Images of Mariatorget metro station

Red line (Stockholm metro) stations
Railway stations opened in 1964